St. Anthony Hospital may refer to:

St. Anthony Hospital (Colorado)
St. Anthony Hospital (Columbus, Ohio)
St. Anthony Hospital (Oklahoma City)
St. Anthony Hospital (Pendleton, Oregon)
St. Anthony Hospital (Gig Harbor, Washington)
Saint Anthony Hospital (Milwaukee, Wisconsin)

See also
St. Anthony's Hospital (disambiguation)

Trauma centers